is a 1986 Japanese film directed by Yōichi Higashi, to a script by Machiko Nasu, based on the 1985 novel of the same title by Junichi Watanabe. The film stars Hitomi Kuroki, in her debut role Tatsuya Fuji, and Yoko Aki.

References

1986 films
1980s Japanese films
1980s Japanese-language films
Films based on Japanese novels